Monoplex trigonus, common name the trigonal hairy triton, is a species of predatory sea snail, a marine gastropod mollusk in the family Cymatiidae.

Distribution
This species is found in the Atlantic Ocean (Cape Verde, West Africa, Gabon, Angola) and in the Caribbean Sea (Venezuela).

Description 
The shell size varies between 21 mm and 60 mm.

The maximum recorded shell length is 40 mm.

Habitat 
Minimum recorded depth is 15 m. Maximum recorded depth is 15 m.

References

Further reading 
 Bernard, P.A. (Ed.) (1984). Coquillages du Gabon [Shells of Gabon]. Pierre A. Bernard: Libreville, Gabon. 140, 75 plates

External links
 

Cymatiidae
Gastropods described in 1791
Taxa named by Johann Friedrich Gmelin
Molluscs of the Atlantic Ocean
Molluscs of Angola
Gastropods of Cape Verde
Invertebrates of Gabon